Manolo Portanova (born 2 June 2000) is an Italian professional footballer who last played as an attacking midfielder for Genoa.

Club career 
Portanova is a youth product of Lazio, having joined in summer 2015, and started playing for their under-19 squad in the 2016–17 season.

In July 2017, Portanova moved to Juventus. He made his Serie C debut for Juventus U23 on 30 March 2019, in a game against Pistoiese, as a 76th-minute substitute for Luca Zanimacchia. His senior and Serie A debut for Juventus came on 26 May 2019, in the club's final match of the season, coming on as a second-half substitute for Emre Can in a 2–0 away loss to Sampdoria. During the match, he set up a goal for Moise Kean, but it was disallowed for offside.

On 29 January 2021, Portanova moved to Genoa for a fee of €10 million, plus a maximum of €5 million in performance-related bonuses.

International career 
Portanova was first called up to represent his country in 2017 with the under-17 squad. He participated in the 2017 UEFA European Under-17 Championship; they did not advance from the group stage. With the Italy U19 squad Portanova took part at the 2019 UEFA European Under-19 Championship.

On 13 October 2020, Portanova made his debut with the Italy U21 side, appearing as a substitute in a 2021 UEFA European Under-21 Championship qualification match against the Republic of Ireland in Pisa, which Italy won 2–0.

Personal life 
Portanova's father Daniele played in the Serie A for Siena, Bologna, and Genoa.

On 10 June 2021, Portanova was placed under house arrest following an injunction related to a case of rape in the city of Siena. On December 6 2022, Portanova was charged with gang rape along with his uncle, Alessio Langella. Both were sentenced to six years in prison, and in addition Portanova was fined with having to pay €100,000 to the victim, €20,000 to the mother of the victim, and €10,000 to a Siena-based women's shelter who took part in the investigation.

Career statistics

Club

Honours

Club 
Juventus U23
 Coppa Italia Serie C: 2019–20

Juventus
 Serie A: 2018–19
Coppa Italia: 2020–21

References

External links 
 

2000 births
Footballers from Naples
Living people
Italian footballers
Italy under-21 international footballers
Italy youth international footballers
Association football midfielders
Juventus F.C. players
Juventus Next Gen players
Genoa C.F.C. players
Serie A players
Serie B players
Serie C players
People convicted of rape
Italian rapists